The Mule Keys are a group of scattered islets in the Florida Keys in Monroe County, Florida, United States. They belong to the outlying islands of the Florida Keys. Administratively, they are an unincorporated area of Monroe County. The islets are part of the Key West National Wildlife Refuge. The islets are uninhabited except for Mule Key, for which the census of 2000 lists one housing unit with a population of two (park rangers or coast guard).

The United States Government has placed most of this area off limits, as a part of the Key West National Wildlife Refuge. It is even prohibited to anchor off Man Key and Woman Key in the sand, although Woman Key was a popular destination for day trippers from Key West in the past, which Boca Grande Key still is. Anchoring off the south part of Boca Grande Key is also prohibited; it is permitted only off the northwest portion.

Ballast Key was privately owned by Key West developer David W. Wolkowsky. After Wolkowsky's death in 2018, the island was donated to The Nature Conservancy, which in turn deeded ownership of the land to the United States Fish and Wildlife Service. 

The westernmost (and largest) islet, Boca Grande Key, is 6 miles (10 km) east of the Marquesas Keys.

12 individual islets are named on detailed topographical maps:

 south of Mule Key, separated from the Mule Keys by West Channel, are three notable submerged reefs, from east to west:
Eastern Dry Rocks, at 
Rock Key, at 
Sand Key, at

References

External links
Census 2000 block statistics
Boating information
Eastern Dry Rocks
Rock Key
Sand Key

Islands of Monroe County, Florida
Lists of coordinates
Beaches of Monroe County, Florida
Islands of the Florida Keys
Beaches of Florida
Islands of Florida